Sugarloaf Mountain is a peak situated in Rio de Janeiro, Brazil, at the mouth of Guanabara Bay on a peninsula that juts out into the Atlantic Ocean. It is known worldwide for its cableway and panoramic views of the city and beyond.

The mountain is one of several monolithic granite and quartz mountains that rise straight from the water's edge around Rio de Janeiro. Geologically, it is considered part of a family of steep-sided rock outcroppings known as non-inselberg bornhardts.

The mountain is protected by the Sugarloaf Mountain and Urca Hill Natural Monument, created in 2006. 
This became part of a World Heritage Site declared by UNESCO in 2012.

Origins of the name
The name Sugarloaf was coined in the 16th century by the Portuguese during the heyday of sugarcane trade in Brazil. According to historian Vieira Fazenda, blocks of sugar were placed in conical molds made of clay to be transported on ships. The form of the peak reminded them of the well-known resulting "sugarloaf" shape, and the nickname has since been extended to be a general descriptor for formations of this kind.

Cable car

A glass-walled cable car (bondinho or, more formally, teleférico), capable of holding 65 people, runs along a  route between the peaks of Sugarloaf and Morro da Urca every 20 minutes. The original cable car line was built in 1912 and rebuilt around 1972–73 and in 2008. The cable car goes from a ground station, at the base of Morro da Babilônia, to Morro da Urca and thence to Sugarloaf's summit.

Reaching the summit
To reach the summit, passengers take two cable cars. The second car ascends to Pão de Açúcar. The Swiss-made bubble-shaped cars offer passengers 360° views of the surrounding city. The ascent takes three minutes from start to finish.

Timeline

1907 – Brazilian engineer Augusto Ferreira Ramos had the idea of linking the hills through a path in the air.
1910 – The same engineer founded the Society of Sugar Loaf and the same year the works were started. The project was commissioned in Germany and built by Brazilian workers. All parts were taken by climbing mountains or lifted by steel cables.
1912 – Opening of the cableway, the first in Brazil and the third of this kind worldwide; the first cable cars were made of coated wood and were used for 61 years.
1973 – The current models of cars were put into operation. This increased the carrying capacity by almost ten times.
2009 – Inauguration of the next generation of cable cars that had already been purchased and are on display at the base of Red beach
2020 – Closed in March 2020 & partially reopened in August 2020.

Rock climbing
There are rock climbing routes on Sugarloaf that are mostly multipitch and are a mixture of sport and trad. There are also two other mountains in the area with technical rock climbing, Morro da Babilônia and Morro da Urca. Together, they form one of the largest urban climbing areas in the world, with more than 270 routes, between 1 and 10 pitches long.

Appearances in media
Flying Down to Rio (1933) Starring Fred Astaire and Ginger Rogers. The beachside Hotel Atlântico has views across the bay looking toward Sugarloaf Mountain.
In the 1979 James Bond film Moonraker, the villainous henchman Jaws (played by Richard Kiel) attempts to kill 007 (Roger Moore) and the agent's ally, Dr. Holly Goodhead (Lois Chiles), on a cable car. However, Bond and Goodhead escape and Jaws collides with the building at the bottom of the cable car route, demolishing the building, but escaping unscathed. 
Herb Alpert recorded a song titled "Sugarloaf" for his 1982 album Fandango.
The mountain and cable car are featured in The Simpsons episode "Blame it on Lisa", aired in 2002.
Mechanic: Resurrection (2016), starring Jason Statham. At the beginning of the film Arthur Bishop (Statham) is attacked at a restaurant on Morro da Urca and escapes on the roof of a cable car.

Gallery

Sugarloaf in art, 16th to 19th century

20th and 21st centuries

References

External links

 — 

Mountains of Brazil
Bornhardts
Guanabara Bay
Geography of Rio de Janeiro (city)
Landforms of Rio de Janeiro (state)
Rock formations of Brazil
Tourist attractions in Rio de Janeiro (city)
Articles containing video clips
First 100 IUGS Geological Heritage Sites